Ng Tat Wai (born 5 September 1947) was one of the top badminton players during the 1970s.

Career 
A right-handed doubles player, Tat Wai had represented and won medals for Malaysia in various tournaments including the Thomas Cup, Commonwealth Games, Asian Games and Southeast Asian Games. During his student years in England, Tat Wai played and won several County open tournaments.

Currently Tat Wai stays in Penang and devotes his time to training.

Achievements

Southeast Asian Peninsular Games 
Men's doubles

Mixed doubles

Commonwealth Games 
Men's doubles

References 

1947 births
Living people
People from Penang
Malaysian sportspeople of Chinese descent
Malaysian male badminton players
Commonwealth Games silver medallists for Malaysia
Badminton players at the 1970 British Commonwealth Games
Badminton coaches
Asian Games medalists in badminton
Badminton players at the 1970 Asian Games
Commonwealth Games medallists in badminton
Asian Games bronze medalists for Malaysia
Medalists at the 1970 Asian Games
Southeast Asian Games medalists in badminton
Southeast Asian Games gold medalists for Malaysia
Medallists at the 1970 British Commonwealth Games